Radzik  Nebievich Kuliyeu (born July 10, 1992, in Dagestan) also known as Radik Kuliev is a Russian-Belarusian Greco-Roman wrestler of Lezgin heritage, who competed for the 2017 European Wrestling Championships and won silver medal at 80 kilos. At the 2017 World Wrestling Championships he became runner-up.

In 2020, he won one of the bronze medals in the 82 kg event at the 2020 Individual Wrestling World Cup held in Belgrade, Serbia.

References

External links
 

1994 births
Living people
People from Khasavyurtovsky District
Russian people of Dagestani descent
Russian male sport wrestlers
Belarusian male sport wrestlers
Wrestlers at the 2019 European Games
European Games competitors for Belarus
World Wrestling Championships medalists
European Wrestling Championships medalists
Sportspeople from Dagestan